FBOP Corporation was a financial services company based in Oak Park, Illinois, United States.  As of mid-2009, it had $18.5 billion in assets and was the 46th largest bank holding company in the United States. On October 30, 2009, FBOP's banking subsidiaries were closed by their chartering agencies and the Federal Deposit Insurance Corporation was appointed as their receiver.  The company had over 4064 employees.

The holding company began as First Bank of Oak Park.  FBOP started acquiring other banks in 1990.  In 2006, First Bank of Oak Park merged with four other co-owned banks in Illinois to create Park National Bank.  FBOP operated banks in Illinois, California, Texas, and Arizona, prior to their closure.

U.S. Bancorp acquired all nine of FBOP's nine banks on the day of closure, but later sold the three Texas-based banks to Prosperity Bancshares.

Key people 
 Chairman: Michael E. Kelly
 President: Robert M. Heskett
 SVP and CFO: Michael Dunning

Former subsidiaries

Acquisition history

Bank failure
FBOP's subsidiaries lost an estimated $800 million when the United States Treasury placed government-sponsored mortgage investors Fannie Mae (FNM, Fortune 500) and Freddie Mac (FRE, Fortune 500) into conservatorship and wiped out preferred stockholders.  As a result, FBOP posted an operating loss of $708 million for 2008. By the end of June, FBOP's resources had dwindled so low that the firm ranked below 98% of similar bank holding companies in terms of tier 1 leverage ratio, a measure of bank capital.

In August 2009, FBOP signed a so-called written agreement with the Federal Reserve that gave it a schedule to raise capital, improve risk management and reduce its concentration of commercial real estate loans. The bank was to submit a capital plan within 30 days.

FBOP failed to raise enough capital to satisfy the terms of the agreement. On October 30, 2009, FBOP's subsidiaries were closed by their chartering agencies and the Federal Deposit Insurance Corporation was appointed as their receiver.  The FDIC entered into a purchase and assumption agreement with Minnesota-based U.S. Bancorp to assume the assets and deposit liabilities of the closed banks.  The FDIC estimates its losses on the combined transaction at $2.5 billion.

References

Further reading

External links 

Bank failures in the United States
Banks based in Illinois
Banks with year of establishment missing
Companies based in Cook County, Illinois
Privately held companies based in Illinois
U.S. Bancorp
Defunct banks of the United States
Defunct companies based in Illinois
Banks disestablished in 2009
2009 disestablishments in Illinois